Holmes Summit is a peak rising to , the highest elevation in the Read Mountains of the Shackleton Range in Antarctica. It was photographed from the air by the U.S. Navy in 1967 and was surveyed by the British Antarctic Survey in the period 1968–71. In association with the names of geologists grouped in this area, it was named by the UK Antarctic Place-Names Committee in 1971 after Professor Arthur Holmes, after whom the Holmes Hills in Palmer Land were also named.

References

Mountains of Coats Land
Summits